A democratic deficit (or democracy deficit) occurs when ostensibly democratic organizations or institutions (particularly governments) fall short of fulfilling the principles of democracy in their practices or operation where representative and linked parliamentary integrity becomes widely discussed.

The phrase democratic deficit is cited as first being used by the Young European Federalists in their Manifesto in 1977, which was drafted by Richard Corbett.
The phrase was also used by David Marquand in 1979, referring to the then European Economic Community, the forerunner of the European Union.

Examples 

The UN Parliamentary Assembly has been proposed as a way of ameliorating a democratic deficit within the United Nations.

Some scholars have argued that the ratification of European Union treaties by repeated referendums—such as those held in Ireland for the Treaty of Nice and the Treaty of Lisbon—is also associated with a democratic deficit. With national parliaments giving up power to the centralised European Parliament. As European Union citizens elect those who make up Council who then elect those become that Commissioners, there is a real fear it is too distant for many citizens.  Often EU elections are treated as second order with protest votes more common during national and local elections, example of this would be the success of anti immigration parties such as Europe of Freedom and Direct Democracy. Another problem in the EU is that voters vote more on the basis of national issues in the European parliamentary elections and that the election is more used by voters to punish their government in the middle of their term. There is also insufficiently a European public opinion or European public sphere that votes against or rewards European politicians. Another problem is the big influence of lobbying groups on European institutions. The European Parliament was created to give more democratic legitimacy to the EU, but shares legislative power with the Council of the European Union, which has one vote per country.

A study of the Columbia University concluded that policy in U.S. states is congruent with the majority only half the time. The largest influences were found to be legislative professionalization, term limits, and issue salience. Partisanship and interest groups affect the ideological balance of incongruence more than the aggregate degree thereof. Policy is found to be overresponsive to ideology and party, leading policy to be polarized relative to state electorates. The large differences in voter turnout during the American elections for various income groups are also seen as a problem for the functioning of democracy. Sanford Levinson argues that next to the fact that campaign financing and gerrymandering are seen as serious problems for democracy, also one of the root causes of the American democratic deficit lies in the United States Constitution itself, for example there is a lack of representation in the Senate for highly populated states such as California.

See also
List of democracy indices
Defective democracy
Democracy Index
Democratic legitimacy of the European Union
Direct democracy
Elite theory
Freedom deficit
How Democratic Is the American Constitution?
Political alienation
Political polarization
Popular assembly
Post-democracy

References

1977 neologisms
Democracy
United Nations reform